Dioctria cothurnata is a Palearctic species of robber fly in the family Asilidae.

References

External links
Geller Grim Robberflies of Germany
Images representing Dioctria cothurnata

Asilidae
Insects described in 1820
Diptera of Europe
Taxa named by Johann Wilhelm Meigen